Hemophiliac is an experimental musical act. This group is billed as "improvisational music from the outer reaches of madness". Mike Patton does voice effects along with John Zorn on saxophone and Ikue Mori on laptop electronics.

Discography
2002 – Hemophiliac (limited two-disc set)
2004 – 50th Birthday Celebration Volume 6

American experimental musical groups